Katharine Houghton (born Katharine Houghton Grant; March 10, 1945) is an American actress and playwright. She portrayed Joanna "Joey" Drayton, a white woman who brings home her black fiancé to meet her parents, in the 1967 film Guess Who's Coming to Dinner. Katharine Hepburn, who played the mother of Houghton's character in the film, was Houghton's aunt. She is also known for her role as Kanna, Katara and Sokka’s grandmother in the film The Last Airbender (2010).

Early life
Houghton was born in Hartford, Connecticut, the second child of Marion Hepburn and Ellsworth Grant. She attended Kingswood-Oxford School and Sarah Lawrence College, where she majored in philosophy and art. Houghton was named after her maternal grandmother, Connecticut suffragist and reformer Katharine Martha Houghton Hepburn.

Her aunt, Katharine Hepburn, was instrumental in helping Houghton launch her career. The acting torch was later carried by Houghton's niece, actress Schuyler Grant.

Career

Acting
Houghton has played leading roles in over 60 productions on Broadway, off-Broadway and in regional theatres across America. She won the Theatre World Award for her performance in A Scent of Flowers off Broadway in 1969.

Houghton has presented lectures at venues across the country including the 2001 Fall Concert & Lectures Series at the Metropolitan Museum of Art and at The Cosmopolitan Club. She lectured at the Metropolitan Museum of Art again in June 2008, presenting "Saucy Gamine, Reluctant Penitent, and Glorious Victor", a review of her aunt's career in Hollywood as reflected in three of her films.

Writing
Houghton is also a playwright. In addition to writing her own plays, she has completed translations of others' works. Eleven of her plays have been produced.

Her play Buddha was published in Best Short Plays of 1988. Her musical Bookends premiered at the New Jersey Repertory Company in summer of 2007, received rave notices, and garnered the theater the highest box office sales in their 11-year history. Since then it has twice been part of The York Theatre's Developmental Reading Series and is being redeveloped.

In 1975, Houghton wrote a children's story, "The Wizard's Daughter", which is collected in the book Two Beastly Tales, illustrated by Joan Patchen. The second story in the book is written by JB Grant, Houghton's elder brother.

Filmography

Film

Television

See also
 Houghton family

References

External links
 
 

1945 births
20th-century American actresses
20th-century American dramatists and playwrights
21st-century American actresses
Actresses from Hartford, Connecticut
American film actresses
American stage actresses
American television actresses
Living people
Sarah Lawrence College alumni